Código F.A.M.A. is the first reality television show  for children in Mexico.

Format
From thousands of auditions, 40 (in season 1), 16 (season 2), 17 (season 3) children are chosen to form the first "phase" of the show, which is called "Código Bronce" or "Code Bronze".

In the second phase, the finalists — 8 (season 1), 6 (seasons 2 and 3) — are revealed. The second phase is called "Código Plata" or "Code Silver".

The third and final phase is reached as a winner is announced and this level is known as "Código Oro" or "Code Gold".

Every participant who reaches a certain "code" receives a medal of the respective metal, i.e., bronze, silver or gold.

Season 1: Código F.A.M.A.

Winner: Código Oro (Code Gold)
 Miguel Martinez"

Finalists: Código Plata (Code Silver)
 2nd place: Adán Nieves
 3rd place: Gladys Gallegos
 4th place: Sergio Guerrero
 5th place: Diego Boneta (then credited as Diego González)
 6th place: Xitlali Rodríguez
 7th place: María Chacón
 8th place: Jesús Zavala

Alegríjes y Rebujos
The winner, Miguel Martínez, went on to star in the Mexican soap opera Alegrijes y Rebujos", along with seven others from the final group of eight (María Chacón, Jesús Zavala, Diego González, Nora Cano, Michelle Álvarez, Antonio Hernández and Allisson Lozano). The soap opera was a success, as were the two soundtrack albums that were released from the show. All eight of the actors continued to perform as a musical group with the same name as the soap opera. They toured Mexico and were also involved in the second season of Código F.A.M.A..

Season 2: Código F.A.M.A. 2

Winner: Código Oro (Code Gold)Jonathan BecerraFinalists: Código Plata (Code Silver)
 2nd place: Marijose Salazar
 3rd place: Jorge Escobedo
 4th place: Alex Rivera
 5th place: Brissia Mayagoitia
 6th place: J. Sergio Ortiz Pérez

Eliminated: Código Bronce (Code Bronze)
 7th: José Alberto Inzunza
 8th: Anhuar Escalante
 9th: Elisabet Martínez Saldívar
 10th: Claudia Ledón Olguín
 11th: Paula Gutierrez D'Esesarte
 12th: Viviana Ramos Macouzet
 13th: María Fernanda González
 14th: Israel Salas Hernández
 15th: Ricardo Lorenzo Balderas
 16th: Mónica López Alonso

Misión S.O.S.
The winner went on to star in the novela Misión S.O.S. with three other contestants (Marijose Salazar, Alex Rivera and Anhuar Escalante). Also appearing were contestants from the first season of Código FAMA, including Miguel Martínez (the winner) and Gladys Gallegos in her first TV role. The novela was also a success. They also kept a group with the same name as the novela, toured Mexico and released a soundtrack with original music made for the telenovela.

Season 3: Código F.A.M.A. 3

Winner: Código Oro (Code Gold)Adriana AhumadaFinalists: Código Plata (Code Silver)
 Miguel Jiménez
 Fernanda Jiménez
 Rodrigo Salas

Eliminated: Código Bronce (Code Bronze)
 Jesús Trejo
 Alann Mora
 Evelin Acosta
 Maritza Barraza
 Joel Bernal
 Cecilia Camacho
 Ricardo Ceceña
 Estefania Contreras
 Mariana Dávila
 Iván Félix
 Juan José Huerta
 Alejandra Leza
 Mónica López
 Claritze Rodríguez
 Joel Bernal

La Fea Más Bella
Unlike the previous winners, there was not a children's telenovela starring Adriana Ahumada. She had a small role in the telenovela by the same producer of the show. She played the daughter of Lola, who is a part of Letty's "Ugly Squad". Also appearing were Miguel Jiménez and Fernanda Jiménez, who also had small roles in La Fea Más Bella, as the son of Paula María and the daughter of Martha (Paula and Martha are also part of Letty's "Ugly Squad").

The winner of Codigo F.A.M.A. International, Elizabeth Suarez, was the only one that could not participate in La fea mas bella because she was living in Dominican Republic. She was supposed to make a soap opera in Mexico, but the project never continued.

International: Código F.A.M.A. Internacional
This fourth installment began immediately after CF3 concluded. Twenty participants, representing Latin American countries, the United States and Spain, were brought to Mexico to compete for the Code Diamond prize: a recording/acting contract, a music tour of all the twenty participating countries, and scholarships.

Winner: Código Diamante (Code Diamond)
 Elizabeth María Suárez Rosario''', Dominican Republic

Finalists
 2nd place: Felipe Morales Saez, Chile
 3rd place: Fabiola Rodas Valladare, Guatemala
 4th place: Priscila Alcántara Fonseca, Brazil
 5th place: Miguel Darío Narváez Romero, Paraguay

Semi-finalists
 Laura Natalia Esquivel, Argentina
 Oscar Mario Paz Hurtado, Bolivia
 Steve Alberto Cabrera Ortega, Ecuador
 Daniela Hernández, El Salvador
 Gabriel Morales, United States

Eliminated participants
 Adriana Ahumada, Mexico
 Jessie Gabriela Flores Madrid, Honduras
 Lucila María Morena Arana, Nicaragua
 Kevin Alberca Alarcón, Peru
 Erika Lisbeth Loaiza Ramírez, Colombia
 Génesis Díaz Bejarano, Costa Rica
 Javier Vidal Martínez, Spain
 Nallybeth Araúz Martínez, Panama
 Nicolás Aquino Goicoechea, Uruguay
 Asly D'Janine Toro Álvarez, Venezuela

Telenovela
The winner, Elizabeth María Suárez Rosario, has yet to appear in a TV part or record an album.

Mexican reality television series
Singing talent shows